Acrostichum is a fern genus in the Parkerioideae subfamily of the Pteridaceae.   It was one of the original pteridophyte genera delineated by Linnaeus. It was originally drawn very broadly, including all ferns that had sori apparently "acrostichoid", or distributed in a uniform mass across the back of the frond, rather than organized in discrete sori.  This led Linnaeus to include such species as Asplenium platyneuron in the genus, because the specimen he received had sori so crowded that it appeared acrostichoid.

Since Acrostichum aureum is regarded as the type for the genus, it is now narrowly circumscribed only to the natural genus of three species, that are allied to the genus Ceratopteris. They are collectively known as the leather ferns or leather swamp ferns, genus members commonly being found in swamps. They do not withstand prolonged immersion, but require wet roots. The species Acrostichum aureum is known to have a high saltwater tolerance, growing in mangroves.

Species
Acrostichum aureum L.
Acrostichum danaeifolium Langsd. & Fisch.
Acrostichum speciosum Willd.
Acrostichum preaureum fossil plant.

References

 World species list for Acrostichum: https://web.archive.org/web/20090921113828/http://homepages.caverock.net.nz/~bj/fern/acrostichum.htm
 C. Michael Hogan. 2010. Fern. Encyclopedia of Earth. National council for Science and the Environment. Washington, DC

Pteridaceae
Fern genera